Rockaway Parkway is a major commercial street in the Canarsie & Brownsville neighborhoods of Brooklyn, New York.

Canarsie High School, as well as a firehouse and several homes and businesses are on Rockaway Parkway.  The Rockaway Parkway station is the southern terminus of the BMT Canarsie Line. The B42 bus runs primarily along Rockaway Parkway, and riders can transfer for free from the Rockaway Parkway subway station. Contrary to its name, Rockaway Parkway does not enter the Rockaways in Queens. The Sutter Avenue-Rutland Road station is located one block away from the intersection of Rockaway Parkway and Rutland Road, over East 98th Street. The IRT New Lots Line also runs parallel to the street from East NY Avenue to Clarkson Avenue.

History
Rockaway Parkway originated as an 18th-century road to the Canarsie Ferry.

Description
Rockaway Parkway is divided into two segments by the Bay Ridge Branch of the LIRR.

Its northern segment begins at East New York Avenue in Brownsville. It then intersects Linden Boulevard and ends past Ditmas Avenue. The southern segment begins north of Avenue D in Canarsie, then intersects Flatlands Avenue, crosses under the Belt Parkway, and ends at Canarsie Pier. Northbound and southbound traffic is separated by a median between Linden Boulevard and Rockaway Avenue; south of Seaview Avenue, Rockaway Parkway again becomes separated by a median to its southern terminus at Canarsie Pier.

See also
 Rockaway Parkway Line

Parkways in New York City
Streets in Brooklyn
Canarsie, Brooklyn